Payson National Forest was established as the Payson Forest Reserve by the General Land Office in Utah on August 3, 1901, with , located near Nephi. After the transfer of federal forests to the U.S. Forest Service in 1905, it became a National Forest on March 4, 1907. On July 1, 1908, Payson and Vernon National Forests and part of Fillmore were combined to create  Nebo National Forest.  The lands presently exist in Uinta National Forest and contain the Mt. Nebo Wilderness.

See also
Mount Nebo (Utah)

References

External links
Forest History Society
Forest History Society:Listing of the National Forests of the United States Text from Davis, Richard C., ed. Encyclopedia of American Forest and Conservation History. New York: Macmillan Publishing Company for the Forest History Society, 1983. Vol. II, pp. 743-788.

Former National Forests of Utah